Edwar Alfonso Cabrera (born October 20, 1987) is a former professional baseball pitcher. He has played in Major League Baseball (MLB) for the Colorado Rockies.

Professional career

Colorado Rockies
Cabrera was added to the Rockies 40 man roster on November 18, 2011. He was named to participate in the 2012 All-Star Futures Game. Cabrera was invited to spring training in 2012, and sent to minors on March 15. Called up on June 26, to start against the Washington Nationals the next day, Cabrera pitched  innings, yielding five hits, three walks, and seven runs, while recording one strikeout in his major league debut. On June 29, he was optioned to the Colorado Springs Sky Sox. Cabrera was recalled on July 24 to start against the Arizona Diamondbacks that night, and optioned to the minors three days later. On February 14, 2013, the Rockies diagnosed Cabrera with shoulder impingement and placed him on the 60-day disabled list. He had gotten sick over the offseason, which caused him to postpone the start of his throwing program.

Texas Rangers
Cabrera was claimed off waivers by the Texas Rangers on October 16, 2013. He was outrighted off the roster on November 20, 2013.

Houston Astros
After spending two seasons in the Rangers farm system, Cabrera signed a minor league deal with the Houston Astros on January 26, 2016. He was released on May 16, 2016.

References

External links

1987 births
Living people
Asheville Tourists players
Colorado Rockies players
Casper Ghosts players
Dominican Republic expatriate baseball players in the United States
Dominican Summer League Rockies players
Frisco RoughRiders players
Modesto Nuts players
Major League Baseball pitchers
Major League Baseball players from the Dominican Republic
People from Samaná Province
Round Rock Express players
Tri-City Dust Devils players
Tulsa Drillers players
Colorado Springs Sky Sox players
Fresno Grizzlies players
Navegantes del Magallanes players
Dominican Republic expatriate baseball players in Venezuela
Toros del Este players
Dominican Republic expatriate baseball players in Nicaragua